Dennis Riemer (born February 23, 1988) is a German footballer who played in the 3. Liga for TuS Koblenz and Arminia Bielefeld.

External links

1988 births
Living people
German footballers
VfL Wolfsburg II players
TuS Koblenz players
Arminia Bielefeld players
3. Liga players
Association football fullbacks
People from Wolfsburg
Footballers from Lower Saxony